Marie-Christine Blandin (born 22 September 1952, Roubaix) is a member of the Senate of France, representing the Nord department.  She is a member of Europe Écologie–The Greens.

References
Page on the Senate website

1952 births
Living people
French Senators of the Fifth Republic
Women members of the Senate (France)
21st-century French women politicians
Senators of Nord (French department)